Sylfest Lomheim (born 11 March 1945 in Hafslo) is a Norwegian philologist.

He was the director of the Norwegian Language Council from 2003 to 2010. He is also associate professor (amanuensis) in the Norwegian language at the University of Agder. He was rector of its predecessor Agder Regional College from 1987 to 1992.

Lomheim has written works on translation and language standardisation, and has worked in the Norwegian Broadcasting Corporation since 1980, both in radio and TV.

In 1997, under the Jagland's Cabinet, he was appointed state secretary in the Ministry of Children and Family Affairs.

References
 Sylfest Lomheim - Det Norske Samlaget
 Sylfest Lomheim direktør ved nytt kompetansesenter for norsk språk - Regjeringen.no

1945 births
Living people
Norwegian philologists
Directors of government agencies of Norway
Norwegian state secretaries
Labour Party (Norway) politicians
Rectors of universities and colleges in Norway
Academic staff of the University of Agder
People from Luster, Norway